In mathematics, Kan complexes and Kan fibrations are part of the theory of simplicial sets. Kan fibrations are the fibrations of the standard model category structure on simplicial sets and are therefore of fundamental importance. Kan complexes are the fibrant objects in this model category. The name is in honor of Daniel Kan.

Definitions

Definition of the standard n-simplex 

For each n ≥ 0, recall that the standard -simplex, is the representable simplicial set

Applying the geometric realization functor to this simplicial set gives a space homeomorphic to the topological standard -simplex: the convex subspace of ℝn+1 consisting of all points  such that the coordinates are non-negative and sum to 1.

Definition of a horn 

For each k ≤ n, this has a subcomplex , the k-th horn inside , corresponding to the boundary of the n-simplex, with the k-th face removed. Horns of the form  sitting inside  look like the black V at the top of the adjacent image. If  is a simplicial set, then maps

correspond to collections of  -simplices satisfying a compatibility condition, one for each . Explicitly, this condition can be written as follows. Write the -simplices as a list  and require that
These conditions are satisfied for the -simplices of  sitting inside .

Definition of a Kan fibration 

. Stated this way, the definition is very similar to that of fibrations in topology (see also homotopy lifting property), whence the name "fibration".

Technical remarks 
Using the correspondence between -simplices of a simplicial set  and morphisms  (a consequence of the Yoneda lemma), this definition can be written in terms of simplices. The image of the map  can be thought of as a horn as described above. The diagram to the right is an example in two dimensions. Since the black V in the lower diagram is filled in by the blue -simplex, if the black V above maps down to it then the striped blue -simplex has to exist, along with the dotted blue -simplex, mapping down in the obvious way.

Kan complexes defined from Kan fibrations 
In the model category for simplicial sets,  is the terminal object and so a Kan complex is exactly the same as a fibrant object. Conversely, every Kan complex has this property, hence it gives a simple technical condition for a Kan complex.

Examples

Simplicial sets from singular homology 

Taking the set of these maps for all non-negative  gives a graded set,
.
To make this into a simplicial set, define face maps  by

and degeneracy maps  by
.

Relation with geometric realization 
It is worth noting the singular functor is right adjoint to the geometric realization functorgiving the isomorphism

Simplicial sets underlying simplicial groups 
It can be shown that the simplicial set underlying a simplicial group is always fibrantpg 12. In particular, for a simplicial abelian group, its geometric realization is homotopy equivalent to a product of Eilenberg-Maclane spacesIn particular, this includes classifying spaces. In fact, this set can be constructed explicitly using the Dold–Kan correspondence of a chain complex and taking the underlying simplicial set of the simplicial abelian group.

Geometric realizations of small groupoids 
Another important source of examples are the simplicial sets associated to a small groupoid . This is defined as the geometric realization of the simplicial set  and is typically denoted . We could have also replaced  with an infinity groupoid. It is conjectured that the homotopy category of geometric realizations of infinity groupoids is equivalent to the homotopy category of homotopy types. This is called the homotopy hypothesis.

Non-example: standard n-simplex 
It turns out the standard -simplex  is not a Kan complexpg 38. The construction of a counter example in general can be found by looking at a low dimensional example, say . Taking the map  sendinggives a counter example since it cannot be extended to a map  because the maps have to be order preserving. If there was a map, it would have to sendbut this isn't a map of simplicial sets.

Categorical properties

Simplicial enrichment and function complexes 
For simplicial sets  there is an associated simplicial set called the function complex , where the simplices are defined asand for an ordinal map  there is an induced map(since the first factor of Hom is contravariant) defined by sending a map  to the composition

Exponential law 
This complex has the following exponential law of simplicial sets
which sends a map  to the composite map
where  for  lifted to the n-simplex .
^

Kan fibrations and pull-backs 

Applications

Homotopy groups of Kan complexes 
The homotopy groups of a fibrant simplicial set may be defined combinatorially, using horns, in a way that agrees with the homotopy groups of the topological space which realizes it. For a Kan complex  and a vertex , as a set  is defined as the set of maps  of simplicial sets fitting into a certain commutative diagram: Notice the fact  is mapped to a point is equivalent to the definition of the sphere  as the quotient  for the standard unit ballDefining the group structure requires a little more work. Essentially, given two maps  there is an associated -simplice  such that  gives their addition. This map is well-defined up to simplicial homotopy classes of maps, giving the group structure. For , it is defined as the homotopy classes  of vertex maps .

Homotopy groups of simplicial sets 
These fibrant replacements can be thought of a topological analogue of resolutions of a chain complex (such as a projective resolution or a flat resolution).

See also
Model category
Simplicial homotopy theory
Simplicially enriched category
Weak Kan complex (also called quasi-category, ∞-category)
∞-groupoid
Fibration of simplicial sets

References

 An elementary illustrated introduction to simplicial sets

Bibliography

 

Simplicial sets
Homotopy theory